Chinja is a genus of Tanzanian araneomorph spiders in the family Zoropsidae, first described by D. Polotow & C. Griswold in 2018.  it contains only two species.

References

External links

Endemic fauna of Tanzania
Araneomorphae genera
Zoropsidae